was a Japanese track and field athlete. He competed in the men's high jump at the 1936 Summer Olympics. He later became a reporter for the Asahi Shimbun newspaper, and was especially noted for his reporting on the Shimoyama incident.

References

External links

1913 births
1990 deaths
Japanese reporters and correspondents
Japanese male triple jumpers
Japanese male high jumpers
Olympic male high jumpers
Olympic athletes of Japan
Athletes (track and field) at the 1936 Summer Olympics
Japan Championships in Athletics winners